Dasmosmilia is a genus of small corals in the family Caryophylliidae.

Species
The World Register of Marine Species includes the following species in the genus:
 Dasmosmilia lymani (Pourtalès, 1871)
 Dasmosmilia variegata (Pourtalès, 1871)

References

Caryophylliidae
Scleractinia genera